The men's 100 metre butterfly at the 2007 World Aquatics Championships took place on 30 March (heats, semifinals and a swim-off) and on the evening of 31 March (final) at Rod Laver Arena in Melbourne, Australia. 123 swimmers were entered in the event, of which 118 swam.

Existing records at the start of the event were:
World record (WR): 50.40, Ian Crocker (USA), 30 July 2005 in Montreal, Canada.
Championship record (CR): 50.40, Ian Crocker (USA), Montreal 2005 (30 July 2005)

Results

Finals

Semifinals

Swim-off for 8th/Finals
 Jason Dunford (Kenya) — 51.85 (Q)
 Ryan Pini (Papua New Guinea) — 52.10

Heats

See also
 Swimming at the 2005 World Aquatics Championships – Men's 100 metre butterfly
 Swimming at the 2008 Summer Olympics – Men's 100 metre butterfly
 Swimming at the 2009 World Aquatics Championships – Men's 100 metre butterfly

References

Men's 100m Fly Heats results from the 2007 World Championships. Published by OmegaTiming.com (official timer of the '07 Worlds); retrieved 2009-07-11.
Men's 100m Fly Semifinals results from the 2007 World Championships. Published by OmegaTiming.com (official timer of the '07 Worlds); retrieved 2009-07-11.
Men's 100m Fly Semifinals swim-off results (for 8th place in semis) from the 2007 World Championships. Published by OmegaTiming.com (official timer of the '07 Worlds); retrieved 2009-07-11.
Men's 100m Fly Final results from the 2007 World Championships. Published by OmegaTiming.com (official timer of the '07 Worlds); retrieved 2009-07-11.

Men's 100 metre butterfly
Swimming at the 2007 World Aquatics Championships